Paulo Ribeiro (born 1984) is a Portuguese football goalkeeper.

Paulo Ribeiro may  also refer to:
 Paulo Machado (born 1986), Portuguese football midfielder
 João Paulo Pinto Ribeiro (born 1980), Portuguese football centre forward
 Paulo Almeida Ribeiro (1932–2007), Brazilian football player